In dance or hip hop music sampling, chopping is the "altering [of] a sampled phrase [or break] by dividing it into smaller segments and reconfiguring them in a different order." (Schloss 2004, p. 106)

Sources
Schloss, Joseph G. (2004). Making Beats: The Art of Sample-Based Hip Hop. Middletown, Connecticut: Wesleyan University Press. .

DJing
Sampling (music)